The FIVB Beach Volleyball U21 World Championship is a double-gender international beach volleyball tournament for athletes under the age of 21. The competition first took place in Le Lavandou, France in 2001.

Results summary

Men's tournament

Women's tournament

Medals table

Men

Women

Total

See also
FIVB Beach Volleyball U23 World Championships
FIVB Beach Volleyball U19 World Championships
FIVB Beach Volleyball U17 World Championships

References

Recurring sporting events established in 2001
U21
Beach
World youth sports competitions
Youth volleyball